Westport-Union Landing State Beach is located in Mendocino County in Northern California. Fishing is common on this beach.

It is named after two early-day communities, Westport and Union Landing. Westport is a sawmill town that is still in existence while only few buildings remain in Union Landing.

See also
List of beaches in California
List of California state parks

References

External links

Parks in Mendocino County, California
Beaches of Mendocino County, California
California State Reserves
California State Beaches
State parks of California
Beaches of Northern California